R. Jack Behringer (May 13, 1925 – October 5, 2011) was an American football, basketball, and baseball coach.

Behringer was a 1949 graduate of Defiance College in Defiance, Ohio. After spending time as an assistant coach at the College of Wooster in Wooster, Ohio, Behringer began a long career in athletics Grove City College in Grove City, Pennsylvania. He served as the school's head football coach from 1956 to 1972. He also served as the head basketball coach at Grove City during the 1956–57 season, but his longest coaching tenure was as Grove City's baseball coach, serving from 1959 to 1988.

References

1925 births
2011 deaths
Basketball coaches from Ohio
Defiance Yellow Jackets football players
Grove City Wolverines athletic directors
Grove City Wolverines baseball coaches
Grove City Wolverines football coaches
Grove City Wolverines men's basketball coaches
Wooster Fighting Scots football coaches
Wooster Fighting Scots men's basketball coaches
High school football coaches in Ohio
Players of American football from Ohio
Sportspeople from Lima, Ohio